The 2012 congressional elections in Oklahoma were held on November 6, 2012, to determine who would represent the state of Oklahoma in the United States House of Representatives. Oklahoma has five seats in the House, apportioned according to the 2010 United States census. Representatives are elected for two-year terms; those elected will serve in the 113th Congress from January 3, 2013, until January 3, 2015.

Redistricting
A redistricting bill which made only minor alterations to the state's congressional districts was signed into law by Governor Mary Fallin on May 10, 2011. The new map was approved by every member of the congressional delegation.

Overview

District 1

In redistricting, parts of Rogers County, including suburbs east of Tulsa, were moved from the 1st district to the 2nd.  Republican John Sullivan, who has represented the 1st district since 2002, will seek re-election.

Republican primary

Candidates

Nominee
 Jim Bridenstine, U.S. Navy combat pilot

Eliminated in primary
 John Sullivan, incumbent U.S. Representative

Declined
 Randy Brogdon, state senator

Endorsements

Results

Democratic primary

Candidates

Nominee
John Olson, businessman and Army reservist

General election

Endorsements

Polling

Results

District 2

In redistricting, the 2nd district acquired conservative parts of Rogers County and Democratic-leaning parts of Marshall County.  Democrat Dan Boren, who represented the 2nd district since 2005, did not seek re-election.

Democratic primary

Candidates

Nominee
 Rob Wallace, former district attorney and assistant U.S. Attorney

Eliminated in primary
 Earl E. Everett
 Wayne Herriman, businessman

Withdrawn
 Brad Carson, former U.S. Representative

Declined
 Dan Boren, incumbent U.S. Representative
 Kenneth Corn, former state senator
 Jim Wilson, state senator

Results

Runoff results

Republican primary

Candidates

Nominee
 Markwayne Mullin, plumbing company owner

Eliminated in primary
 George Faught, state representative
 Dustin Rowe, former Tishomingo mayor
 Wayne Pettigrew, former state representative
 Dwayne Thompson, pastor
 Dakota Wood, retired Marine Corps lieutenant colonel

Declined
 Josh Brecheen, state senator 
 Randy Brogdon, state senator
 Tad Jones, former state representative
 Charles Thompson, veterinarian and nominee for this seat in 2010

Endorsements

Results

Runoff results

General election

Endorsements

Polling

Predictions

Results

District 3

In redistricting, the 3rd district expanded to include parts of Canadian County and Creek County.  Republican Frank Lucas has represented the 3rd district since 1994.

Republican primary

Candidates

Nominee
 Frank Lucas, incumbent U.S. Representative

Eliminated in primary
 William Craig Stump

Results

Democratic primary

Candidates

Nominee
 Timothy Ray Murray, business consultant

Eliminated in primary
 Frankie Robbins

Results

General election

Endorsements

Results

District 4

Over the decade leading up to the 2010 Census, the 4th district had grown in population more than any other district in Oklahoma.  As a result, parts of Canadian County, Cleveland County and Marshall County were moved out of the 4th district in redistricting.  Republican Tom Cole has represented the 4th district since 2003.

Republican primary

Candidates

Nominee
 Tom Cole, incumbent U.S. Representative

Eliminated in primary
 Gary D. Caissie

Results

Democratic primary

Candidates

Nominee
 Donna Marie Bebo, stay-at-home mom

Eliminated in primary
 Bert Smith

Results

General election

Endorsements

Results

District 5

Republican James Lankford, who has represented the 5th district since January 2011, is running for re-election. Tom Guild, a former political science professor at the University of Central Oklahoma and unsuccessful Democratic primary candidate for the 5th district in 2010, sort the Democratic nomination to challenge Lankford. There was no primary for either party as both Lankford and Guild ran unopposed for the Republican and Democratic nomination respectively and faced Modern Whig Party candidate Pat Martin and Libertarian Robert T. Murphy in the general election, both of whom were under the Independent label.

Republican primary

Candidates

Nominee
James Lankford, incumbent U.S. Representative

Democratic primary

Candidates

Nominee
Tom Guild, former political science professor at the University of Central Oklahoma and candidate for this seat in 2010

General election

Endorsements

Results

References

External links
Oklahoma State Election Board
United States House of Representatives elections in Oklahoma, 2012 at Ballotpedia
Oklahoma U.S. House from OurCampaigns.com
Campaign contributions for U.S. Congressional races in Oklahoma from OpenSecrets
Outside spending at the Sunlight Foundation

Oklahoma
2012
United States House